Hypselobarbus periyarensis is a species of cyprinid fish endemic to Periyar Lake in Kerala, India.  This species can reach   in total length.

References

Hypselobarbus
Endemic fauna of India
Fish described in 1941